The Brodina gas field natural gas field in Brodina, Suceava County. It was discovered in 2009 and developed by Aurelian Oil & Gas and Romgaz.  It began production in 2010 and produces natural gas and condensates. The total proven reserves of the Brodina gas field are around 99 billion cubic feet (2.8 km³), and production is slated to be around 5.3 million cubic feet/day (0.15×105m³) in 2010.

References

Natural gas fields in Romania
Geography of Suceava County